The 2022 Trooping the Colour ceremony was held on Thursday 2 June 2022, as part of the Platinum Jubilee celebrations of Queen Elizabeth II. Over 1,400 parading soldiers, 200 horses and 400 musicians came together in the traditional parade to mark the Queen's Official Birthday, which usually takes place on the second Saturday of June. It was the final Birthday Parade to take place under the reign of Elizabeth II before her death on 8 September that year.

The parade

The parade started at 10 am BST. The colour was trooped by the 1st Battalion, Irish Guards, and more than 1,200 officers and soldiers from the Household Division put on a display of military pageantry on Horse Guards Parade, together with hundreds of Army musicians and around 240 horses. The King's Troop, Royal Horse Artillery fired the 82-gun salute in London's Hyde Park. In a break with tradition, the Prince of Wales (then-Colonel of the Welsh Guards), who was joined by the Duke of Cambridge (then-Colonel of the Irish Guards) and Anne, Princess Royal (Colonel of the Blues and Royals), inspected the guards and took the salute on behalf of Elizabeth II. The Household Cavalry Mounted Regiment returned to Buckingham Palace at the end of the parade, where the Queen, accompanied by the Duke of Kent (Colonel of the Scots Guards), took the salute while standing on the balcony of the palace.

People viewed the display along The Mall as the troops paraded to and from Horse Guards Parade on its journey between Buckingham Palace and the parade ground. The public were also be able to watch the ceremony on a large screen at St James's Park. 7,500 ticketed spectators were present at the Horse Guards Parade and another 7,000 at the Victoria Memorial.

During the rehearsals at Horse Guards Parade, five people were injured after a section of the spectator stands fell apart.

Balcony appearance

After the parade, the royal family's traditional balcony appearance happened as in previous years.

Buckingham Palace announced in May 2022 that "After careful consideration, the Queen has decided this year's traditional Trooping the Colour balcony appearance on Thursday 2nd June will be limited to Her Majesty and those members of the royal family who are currently undertaking official public duties on behalf of the Queen."

The following members of the royal family appeared on the balcony:
The Queen
 The Prince of Wales and the Duchess of Cornwall, the Queen's son and daughter-in-law
 The Duke and Duchess of Cambridge, the Queen's grandson and granddaughter-in-law 
 Prince George of Cambridge, the Queen's great-grandson
 Princess Charlotte of Cambridge, the Queen's great-granddaughter
 Prince Louis of Cambridge, the Queen's great-grandson
 The Princess Royal and Vice Admiral Sir Timothy Laurence, the Queen's daughter and son-in-law
 The Earl and Countess of Wessex and Forfar, the Queen's son and daughter-in-law
 Lady Louise Mountbatten-Windsor, the Queen's granddaughter
 Viscount Severn, the Queen's grandson
 The Duke and Duchess of Gloucester, the Queen's first cousin and his wife
 The Duke of Kent, the Queen's first cousin
Princess Alexandra, The Hon. Lady Ogilvy, the Queen's first cousin

Platinum Jubilee Flypast

A Platinum Jubilee Flypast took place to coincide with the Royal Family's balcony appearance. More than 70 military planes, jets and helicopters, including the Battle of Britain Memorial Flight and the Red Arrows as well as military helicopters that responded to Kabul and Ukraine, took part in the flypast that lasted six minutes.

The aircraft that took part in the flypast included Royal Navy Wildcat, Royal Navy Merlin and Apache helicopters, Puma helicopters, Chinook helicopters, Avro Lancaster, Spitfires, Hurricanes, Embraer Phenom 300, Texan training aircraft, RAF Hercules, RAF Atlas, RAF Globemaster, RAF Poseidon, RAF Rivet Joint, VIP RAF Voyager, RAF Typhoon, RAF Lightning, and Hawks.

See also
The Queen's Platinum Jubilee Beacons

References

External links

Platinum Jubilee of Elizabeth II
2022 in the United Kingdom
June 2022 events in the United Kingdom
Elizabeth II
Events involving British royalty
Military parades in the United Kingdom
Ceremonies in the United Kingdom